Pseudohyaleucerea is a genus of moths in the subfamily Arctiinae. The genus was described by Régo Barros and Machado in 1971.

Species
 Pseudohyaleucerea bartschi (Schaus, 1928)
 Pseudohyaleucerea melanthoides (Schaus, 1920)
 Pseudohyaleucerea nigrozonum (Schaus, 1905)
 Pseudohyaleucerea vulnerata (Butler, 1875)

References

Euchromiina
Moth genera